Millinocket Seaplane Base  is a privately owned, public-use seaplane base located on Ambajejus Lake in Piscataquis County, Maine, United States, seven nautical miles (13 km) northwest of the central business district of Millinocket, a town in Penobscot County.

Facilities and aircraft 
Millinocket Seaplane Base has one landing area measuring 4,000 x 500 feet (1,219 x 152 m). For the 12-month period ending August 19, 2006, the airport had 7,000 aircraft operations, an average of 19 per day: 60% general aviation, 20% scheduled commercial and 20% air taxi.

See also 
Millinocket Municipal Airport

References

External links 
Katahdin Air Service

Seaplane bases in the United States
Airports in Piscataquis County, Maine
Millinocket, Maine